"The Buckaroo of the Badlands" is a 1992 Scrooge McDuck comic by Don Rosa. It's the third of the original 12 chapters in the series The Life and Times of Scrooge McDuck. The story takes place in 1882.

The story was first published in the Danish Anders And & Co. #1992-45; the first American publication was in Uncle Scrooge #287, in August 1994.

Plot 
Fifteen-year-old Teenager Scrooge is traveling to the American West by train. During a conversation with a man who owns some square eggs, the train is robbed by Jesse James and his gang. Scrooge fights them, but falls off the train himself. He comes across some cowboys led by Murdo MacKenzie, transporting cattle and joins them, receiving his own horse, which he names after his sister Hortense, since they have the same bad temper.

He is placed in charge of security of a prize-winning bull, which is then stolen by the McViper brothers. Scrooge follows them to the badlands, where he meets Theodore Roosevelt who tells Scrooge about the satisfaction of earning wealth instead of simply inheriting it. They successfully rescue the bull and return it. Scrooge is then employed by MacKenzie as a cowboy on his farm.

External links

The Buckaroo of the Badlands on Duckman
The Life and Times of $crooge McDuck - Episode 3

Disney comics stories
Donald Duck comics by Don Rosa
Fiction set in 1882
1992 in comics
Comics set in the 19th century
Comics set in the United States
Cultural depictions of Jesse James
Cultural depictions of Theodore Roosevelt
The Life and Times of Scrooge McDuck